Namazgâh or Namaz Gah ( meaning 'Place of prayer'), may refer to:
Iran
 Namazgah, Fars
 Namazgah, Hamadan
 Namazgah, Kurdistan
Azerbaijan
 Namazgah, Azerbaijan
Albania
 Namazgjah, Elbasan
Turkmenistan
Namazga-Tepe, a Bronze Age (BMAC) archaeological site in Turkmenistan
Turkey
Namazgah, Yenice